St. Louis Lambert International Airport  is the primary commercial airport serving metropolitan St. Louis, Missouri, United States. Commonly referred to as Lambert Field or simply Lambert, it is the largest and busiest airport in the state of Missouri. The airport provides nonstop service to airports throughout the United States and to the Caribbean, Mexico, Canada, and Europe. In 2019, it served nearly 16 million passengers with more than 259 daily departures to 78 nonstop domestic and international locations. 

Named for Albert Bond Lambert, an Olympic medalist and prominent St. Louis aviator, the airport rose to international prominence in the 20th century thanks to its association with Charles Lindbergh, its groundbreaking air traffic control (ATC), its status as the primary hub of Trans World Airlines (TWA), and its iconic terminal.

History

Beginnings 

The airport had its beginnings in 1909, when the Aero Club of St. Louis created a balloon launching base called the Permanent Aviation Field and Dirigible Harbor in Kinloch Park, a suburban development of the 1890s. In October 1910, the airfield hosted the first International Air Meet, attracting "many famous persons," including the Wright brothers, who brought six airplanes and their Exhibition Team. President Theodore Roosevelt accepted the club's telegraphed invitation to attend, and after initially ruling out a flight, took off on October 11 with pilot Arch Hoxsey, becoming the first U.S. president to fly. The following year, the airfield—generally called Kinloch Field—was the takeoff point for what is generally regarded as the first parachute jump from an airplane. The club's lease on the land expired in 1912, and the field was closed and its grandstand demolished. Efforts to revive the facility were unsuccessful. 

In June 1920, a nearby 170-acre field was leased to the Missouri Aeronautical Society, which named its facility the St. Louis Flying Field. Among the Society's leading members was Albert Bond Lambert, an Olympic silver medalist golfer in the 1904 Summer Games, president of Lambert Pharmaceutical Corporation (which made Listerine), and the first person to receive a pilot's license in St. Louis. So vigorous was Lambert in his efforts to promote St. Louis aviation that in 1923 the field was renamed Lambert-St. Louis Flying Field. "Major" Lambert (his "rank" was given by the Aero Club and not the military) purchased the field outright in February 1925, and added hangars and a passenger terminal. In the late 1920s, the airport became the first with an air traffic control system–albeit one that communicated with pilots via waving flags. The first controller was Archie League.

Charles Lindbergh's first piloting job was flying airmail for Robertson Aircraft Corporation from the airfield. He stopped at the airport during his cross-country San Diego to New York flight about a week before his record-breaking flight to Paris in 1927. In February 1928, the City of St. Louis leased the airport for $1. Later that year, Lambert sold the airport to the city after a $2 million bond issue was passed, making it one of the first municipally owned airports in the United States.

In 1925, the airport became home to Naval Air Station St. Louis, a Naval Air Reserve facility that became an active-duty installation during World War II.

In 1930, the airport was officially christened Lambert–St. Louis Municipal Airport by Rear Admiral Richard E. Byrd. The first terminal building opened in 1933, and within the decade, the airport was served by Robertson Air Lines, Marquette Airlines, Eastern Air Lines, and Transcontinental & Western Air (later renamed TWA).

During World War II, the airport became a manufacturing base for the McDonnell Aircraft Corporation (later McDonnell Douglas, now Boeing) and Curtiss-Wright.

After World War II: expansion, Ozark Air Lines hub

After the war, NAS St. Louis reverted to a reserve installation, supporting carrier-based fighters and land-based patrol aircraft. When it closed in 1958, most of its facilities were acquired by the Missouri Air National Guard and became Lambert Field Air National Guard Base. Some other facilities were retained by non-flying activities of the Naval Reserve and Marine Corps Reserve, while the rest was redeveloped to expand airline operations at the airport.

Ozark Air Lines began operations at the airport in 1950.

To handle increasing passenger traffic, Minoru Yamasaki was commissioned to design a new terminal, which began construction in 1953. Completed in 1956 at a total cost of $7.2 million, the three-domed design preceded terminals at John F. Kennedy International Airport (JFK) in New York City and Paris–Charles de Gaulle Airport. A fourth dome was added in 1965 following the passage of a $200 million airport revenue bond.

The April 1957 Official Airline Guide shows 44 weekday TWA departures; American, 24; Delta, 16; Ozark, 14; Eastern, 13; Braniff, 6 and Central, 2. The first scheduled jet was a TWA 707 to New York on July 21, 1959.

In 1971, the airport became Lambert–St. Louis International Airport.

In the 1970s, St. Louis city officials proposed to replace Lambert with a new airport in suburban Illinois. After Missouri residents rejected that, Lambert in 1977 received a $290-million expansion that lengthened the runways, increased the number of gates to 81, and boosted its capacity by half. (In 1997, MidAmerica St. Louis Airport would open in Mascoutah, Illinois, far from the site proposed in the 1970s.) Concourse A and Concourse C were rebuilt into bi-level structures with jet bridges as part of a $25 million project in the mid-1970s designed by Sverdrup. The other concourses were demolished. Construction began in the spring of 1976 and was completed in September 1977. A $20 million,  extension of Concourse C for TWA and a $46 million,  Concourse D for Ozark Air Lines (also designed by Sverdrup) were completed in December 1982.

Ozark established its only hub at Lambert in the late 1950s. The airline grew rapidly, going from 36 million revenue passenger miles in 1955, to 229 million revenue passenger miles in 1965. The jet age came to Ozark in 1966 with the Douglas DC-9-10 and its network expanded to Denver, Indianapolis, Louisville, Washington, D.C., New York City, Miami, Tampa, and Orlando. With the addition of jets, Ozark began its fastest period of growth, jumping to 653 million revenue passenger miles in 1970 and 936 million revenue passenger miles in 1975; Ozark soon faced heavy competition in TWA's new hub at Lambert.

In 1979, the year after airline deregulation, STL's dominant carriers were TWA (36 routes) and Ozark (25), followed by American (17) and Eastern (12). Other carriers at STL included Air Illinois, Air Indiana, Braniff International Airways, Britt Airways, Brower Airlines, Delta Air Lines, Frontier Airlines, Northwest Orient, Republic Airlines, Texas International Airlines, Trans-Mo Airlines, and USAir.

Trans World Airlines hub

After airline deregulation in 1978, airlines began to change their operations to a hub and spoke model. Trans World Airlines (TWA) was headquartered in New York City but its main base of employment was at Kansas City International Airport (KCI) and had large operations at Chicago O'Hare International Airport (ORD) as well as St. Louis. TWA deemed Kansas City's terminals unsuitable to serve as a primary hub. TWA reluctantly ruled out Chicago, as its Chicago operation was already losing $25 million a year under competition from American Airlines and United Airlines. This meant that St. Louis was the carrier's only viable option. TWA downsized in Chicago and built up in St. Louis, swapping three Chicago gates for five of American's St. Louis gates. By December 1982, St. Louis accounted for 20% of TWA's domestic capacity. Lambert's terminal was initially too small for this operation, and TWA was forced to use temporary terminals, mobile lounges and airstairs to handle the additional flights. After Concourse D was completed in 1985, TWA began transatlantic service from Lambert to London, Frankfurt, and Paris.

TWA's hub grew again in 1986 when the airline bought Ozark Air Lines, which operated its hub from Lambert's B, C, and D concourses. In 1985, TWA had accounted for 56.6% of boardings at STL while Ozark accounted for 26.3%, so the merged carriers controlled over 80% of the traffic. As of 1986, TWA served STL with nonstop service to 84 cities, an increase from 80 cities served by TWA and/or Ozark in 1985, before the merger.

Lambert again grew in importance for TWA after the airline declared bankruptcy in 1992 and the following year moved its headquarters to St. Louis from Mount Kisco, New York. TWA increased the number of cities served and started routing more connecting passengers through its hub at Lambert. The total number of passengers departing Lambert jumped almost 20% in a year, from 19.9 million passengers in 1993 to 23.4 million in 1994. Growth continued, to 27.3 million by 1997 and the airport's all-time peak of 30.6 million in 2000.

By September 1999, Lambert was TWA's main hub, with 103 destinations served by 515 daily flights: 352 on TWA mainline aircraft and 163 on Trans World Express flights operated by its commuter airline partners. Lambert became the eighth-busiest U.S. airport by flights. Congestion caused delays during peak hours and was exacerbated when bad weather reduced the number of usable runways from three to one, and traffic projections made in the 1980s and 1990s predicted enough growth to strain the airport and the national air traffic system. As a result, city leaders decided to build a  runway, dubbed Runway 11/29, parallel to the two larger existing runways. At $1.1 billion, it was the costliest public works program in St. Louis history. It required moving seven major roads and destroying about 2,000 homes, six churches, and four schools in Bridgeton. Work began in 1998 and continued even as traffic at the airport declined after the 9/11 attacks, the collapse of TWA and its subsequent purchase by American, and American's flight reductions several years later.

American Airlines and hub closure

As TWA entered the new millennium, its financial condition deteriorated; it was purchased by American Airlines in April 2001. The last day of operations for TWA was December 1, 2001, including a ceremonial last flight to TWA's original and historic hometown of Kansas City before returning to St. Louis one final time.  The following day, TWA was officially absorbed into American Airlines. The plan for Lambert was to become a reliever hub for the existing American hubs at Chicago–O'Hare and Dallas/Fort Worth (DFW). American was looking at something strategic with its new St. Louis hub to potentially offload some of the pressure on O'Hare as well as provide a significant boost to the airline's east/west connectivity.

The September 11 attacks depressed air service nationwide: total airline industry domestic revenue passenger miles dropped 20% in October 2001 and 17% in November 2001. Overnight, American no longer had the same need for a hub that bypassed its hubs at Chicago and Dallas/Fort Worth, which suddenly became less congested. As a result of this and the ongoing economic recession, service at Lambert was reduced to 207 flights by November 2003. Total passenger traffic dropped to 20.4 million that same year. On the international front, flights to Paris went to seasonal in December 2001 and transatlantic service was soon discontinued altogether when American dropped flights to London in late 2003.

In 2006, the United States Air Force (USAF) announced plans to turn the 131st Fighter Wing of the Missouri Air National Guard into the 131st Bomb Wing. The wing's 20 F-15C and F-15D aircraft were moved to the Montana Air National Guard's 120th Airlift Wing at Great Falls International Airport/Air National Guard Base, Montana and the Hawaii Air National Guard's 154th Wing at Hickam AFB, Hawaii. The pilots and maintainers moved to Whiteman AFB, Missouri to fly and maintain the B-2 Spirit stealth bomber as the first Air National Guard wing to fly the aircraft. Lambert Field Air National Guard Base formally shut down on June 13, 2009, when the final two F-15C Eagles did a low approach over the field and then flew away, ending an 86-year chapter of Lambert's history.

2006 also saw the completion of the W-1W airport expansion after eight years of work. The culmination of this program was the opening of Runway 11/29, the airport's fourth, on April 13, 2006, when American Airlines Flight 2470 became the first commercial airliner to land on the new runway.

In 2008, Lambert's position as an American Airlines hub faced further pressure due to increased fuel costs and softened demand because of a depressed economy. American cut its overall system capacity by over 5% during 2008. At Lambert, American shifted more flights from mainline to regional. Total passengers enplaned fell 6% to 14.4 million in 2008, then fell another 11% to 12.8 million passengers in 2009. In 2009, American announced that as a part of the airline's restructuring, it would close its St. Louis hub by reducing its operations from about 200 daily flights to 36 daily flights by summer 2010. American's closure of the St. Louis hub coincided with its new "Cornerstone" plan, wherein the airline would concentrate itself in several major markets: Chicago, Dallas/Fort Worth, Miami, New York, and Los Angeles.  A 12-gate section of Concourse D closed in 2009 as a result of the hub closure.  Further flight reductions led to the closure of Concourse B and the rest of Concourse D in 2010 (though some gates at the east end of Concourse D are now part of Concourse E).

Recent years

In the aftermath of the American hub closure, Southwest Airlines boosted daily departures from 74 to 83, adding six new destinations for a total of 31. Southwest quickly replaced American as the carrier with the most daily flights, and continues to dominate the airport to this day.  Southwest Airlines had been growing steadily at Lambert since the mid 1990s.  In 1998, the East Terminal (known today as Terminal 2) and Concourse E opened to accommodate Southwest's growth, where they operate today.

On April 22, 2011, a tornado (rated EF4 nearby but not at the airport itself) struck the airport's Terminal 1, destroying jetways and breaking more than half of the windows. The wind damaged a Southwest Airlines aircraft by pushing a baggage conveyor belt into it. Four American Airlines aircraft were damaged, including one that was buffeted by  crosswinds while taxiing after landing. Another aircraft, with passengers still on board, was moved away from its jetway by the storm. The FAA closed the airport at 8:54 pm CDT, and reopened it the following day at temporarily lower capacity. The damage to Concourse C even forced the airport to temporarily reopen some of Concourses B and D for additional gate space. Concourse C underwent renovations and repairs and reopened on April 2, 2012.

In late 2016, officials with the City of St. Louis announced that brand researchers had found that travelers might be confused by the name "Lambert–St. Louis International Airport". They said they might rename it St. Louis International Airport at Lambert Field to freshen up the airport's image and emphasize "St. Louis" in the name. Descendants of Albert Bond Lambert opposed the change, arguing that it de-emphasized the importance of Maj. Lambert to the airport's history and the history of aviation. The proposal was amended, and the St. Louis Airport Commission voted unanimously  to change the name to St. Louis Lambert International Airport.

In 2018, WOW air began four weekly A321 flights between St. Louis and Reykjavík, marking a return of transatlantic service to the airport for the first time since 2003. Despite strong sales, WOW announced in October 2018 that it would end the route due to the airline's financial struggles. Other domestic carriers such as Sun Country Airlines and Spirit Airlines have begun flying from Lambert in recent years.

In December 2021, Lufthansa announced nonstop service between St. Louis and Frankfurt beginning in June 2022. The flight will be the first full service transatlantic flight from St. Louis since American Airlines ended their London route in 2003, and is being backed by several area corporations, including Sigma-Aldrich and Monsanto, both of which have been acquired by German firms in recent years.

Future
In early 2022, airport officials released a plan that would consolidate both existing terminals into one, at the existing Terminal 1 site. The proposal would gradually demolish Concourses A, B, C and build a single new concourse with 62 gates in its place, while retaining the iconic domed terminal building. Following the completion, Terminal 2 would be demolished or repurposed.

Facilities

Terminals 
The airport has two terminals, five concourses, and 86 gates. 

Terminal 1 contains 36 gates across two concourses, lettered A and C. It also has an American Airlines Admirals Club and one of the nation's largest USO facilities. 
Terminal 2 contains 18 gates across one concourse, lettered E. It also has a public lounge operated by Wingtips. All international flights without border preclearance are processed in Terminal 2.

Runways

The airport has four runways: three parallel and one crosswind. The newest runway is 11/29, completed in 2006 as part of a large expansion program.

The airport's current ~156-foot (~47.6-meter) control tower opened in 1997 at a cost of about $15 million.

Ground transportation

Metro Train To City

The airport is served by MetroLink's (St. Louis' mass transportation system) Red Line with stations at  Terminal 1 and Terminal 2. The Metro lines provide direct or indirect service to downtown St. Louis, the Clayton area, and Illinois suburbs in St. Clair County.

The airport is served by I-70; eastbound leads to downtown St. Louis and Illinois with a north–south connection at I-170 immediately east of the airport, while westbound leads to St. Louis exurbs in St. Charles County with a north–south connection at I-270 immediately west of the airport.

Art and historical pieces

Black Americans in Flight is a mural that depicts African American aviators and their contributions to aviation since 1917. It is located in Terminal 1 / Main Terminal on the lower level near the entrance to gates C and D and baggage claim. The first panel includes Albert Edward Forsythe and C. Alfred Anderson, the first black pilots to complete a cross-country flight; the Tuskegee Institute and the Tuskegee Airmen; Eugene Bullard; Bessie Coleman; and Willa Brown, the first African American woman commercial pilot. The second panel shows Benjamin O. Davis Jr., Clarence "Lucky" Lester, and Joseph Ellesberry. The third panel shows Gen. Daniel "Chappie" James, Capt. Ronald Radliff, and Capt. Marcella Hayes. The fourth and fifth panels show Ronald McNair, who died in the Space Shuttle Challenger disaster in 1986, Guion Bluford, who in 1983 became the first African American in space, and Mae Jemison, the first African American woman in space. Spencer Taylor and Solomon Thurman created the mural in 1990. The mural had a re-dedication ceremony in 2012.

One aircraft from the Missouri History Museum currently hangs from Lambert's ceilings. This aircraft, a red Monocoupe 110 Special manufactured in St. Louis in 1931, hangs in the ticketing hall of Terminal 2. The airport has also played host to two other aircraft. A Monocoupe D-127 hung near the eastern security checkpoint in Terminal 1. Charles Lindbergh bought it in 1934 from the Lambert Aircraft Corporation and flew it as his personal aircraft. It was removed in 2018 and returned to the Missouri Historical Society, from which the aircraft had been on loan since 1979, for preservation purposes. Until 1998, a Ryan B-1 Brougham, a replica of the Spirit of St. Louis, hung next to the D-127.

Airlines and destinations

Passenger

Cargo

Statistics

Top destinations

Airline market share

Airport traffic

Accidents and incidents

Accidents 
 August 5, 1936: Chicago and Southern Flight 4, a Lockheed 10 Electra headed for Chicago, crashed after takeoff, killing all eight passengers and crew. The pilot became disoriented in fog.
 January 23, 1941: a Douglas DC-3 of Transcontinental & Western Air crashed 0.4 miles west of St. Louis Municipal Airport during a landing attempt in adverse weather, killing two occupants out of the 14 on board.
 August 1, 1943: during a demonstration flight of an "all St. Louis-built glider", a Waco CG-4A, USAAF serial 42-78839, built by sub-contractor Robertson Aircraft Company, lost its starboard wing due to a defective wing strut support and plummeted vertically to the ground at Lambert Field, killing all on board, including St. Louis Mayor William D. Becker; Maj. William B. Robertson and Harold Krueger, both of Robertson Aircraft; Thomas Dysart, president of the St. Louis Chamber of Commerce; Max Doyne, director of public utilities; Charles Cunningham, department comptroller; and Henry Mueller, St. Louis Court presiding judge. The failed component had been manufactured by Robertson subcontractor Gardner Metal Products Company, of St. Louis, which, coincidentally, had been a casket maker.
 September 6, 1944: the starboard engine of the sole completed McDonnell XP-67 prototype, USAAF serial 42-11677, caught fire during a test flight. Test pilot E.E. Elliot executed an emergency landing at Lambert Field and escaped, but the fire rapidly spread, destroying the aircraft. This was a crippling setback to the XP-67 program, which had been plagued by delays and technical problems, and the second prototype was only 15% complete, so flight testing could not promptly resume. The United States Army Air Forces deemed the XP-67 unnecessary and canceled the program.
 May 24, 1953: a Meteor Air Transport Douglas DC-3 crashed on approach to the airport, killing six of the seven people on board.
 February 28, 1966: astronauts Elliot See and Charles Bassett – the original crew of the Gemini 9 mission – were killed in the crash of their T-38 trainer while attempting to land at Lambert Field in bad weather. The aircraft crashed into the same McDonnell Aircraft Corporation building (adjacent to the airport) where their spacecraft was being assembled.
 March 20, 1968: a McDonnell F-4 Phantom II jet fighter crashed on takeoff during a test flight. The aircraft pitched up and stalled almost immediately after lifting from the runway; both crewmen were able to eject and were not seriously injured. The aircraft was destroyed in the ensuing explosion and fire. The crash was allegedly caused by a wrench socket, mistakenly left in the cockpit by maintenance crews, becoming lodged inside the control stick well on takeoff, jamming the stick in the full aft position.
The Cessna was destroyed and both of its occupants were killed. The DC-9 sustained light damage and was able to land safely; none of its 44 passengers or five crewmembers were injured. The accident was attributed to inadequate visual flight rules (VFR) procedures in place at the airport, the failure of the DC-9 crew to spot the other aircraft in time, the Cessna crew's deviation from their traffic pattern instructions, and poor communications between the Cessna pilots and air traffic control.
 July 23, 1973: while on the approach to land at St. Louis International Airport, Ozark Air Lines Flight 809 crashed near the University of Missouri – St. Louis, killing 38 of the 44 persons on board. Wind shear was cited as the cause. A tornado had been reported at Ladue, Missouri, about the time of the accident but the National Weather Service did not confirm that there was a tornado.
 July 6, 1977: a Fleming International Airways Lockheed L-188 Electra, a cargo flight, crashed during the takeoff roll; all three occupants were killed.
 January 9, 1984: Douglas DC-3 registration C-GSCA of Skycraft Air Transport crashed on take-off, killing one of its two crew members. The aircraft was on an international cargo flight to Toronto Pearson International Airport, Canada. Both engines lost power shortly after take-off. The aircraft had been fueled with jet fuel instead of avgas.
 April 8, 1990: A Missouri Air National Guard F-4 Phantom II veered off the runway during takeoff, crashed, and burst into flames. The pilot suffered minor injuries after his ejection seat failed to deploy and he was forced to exit the burning wreckage while the weapons officer fractured his left leg when he ejected from the aircraft.
 November 22, 1994: TWA Flight 427 collided with a Cessna 441 Conquest, registration N441KM, at the intersection of runway 30R and taxiway Romeo. The TWA McDonnell Douglas MD-82 was taking off for Denver and had accelerated through  when the collision occurred. The MD-82 sustained substantial damage during the collision. The Cessna 441, operated by Superior Aviation, was destroyed. The pilot and the passenger were killed. The investigation found the Cessna 441 had entered the wrong runway for its takeoff.

See also 

 List of airports in Missouri
 Missouri World War II Army Airfields

References

External links 

 St. Louis Lambert International Airport official site
 
 Video of President Theodore Roosevelt's October 1911 flight, from the Library of Congress
 OpenNav airspace and charts for KSTL
 Passenger, Cargo and Flight Open Data for STL

 
Airports established in 1923
1923 establishments in Missouri
Airports in Greater St. Louis
Concrete shell structures
Airfields of the United States Army Air Forces in Missouri
Transportation buildings and structures in St. Louis County, Missouri
Berkeley, Missouri
Government of St. Louis